''Central Council may refer to:

Cultural and Religious organisations 
 Central Council of Muslims in Germany (Zentralrat der Muslime in Deutschland)
 Central Council of Jews in Germany (Zentralrat der Juden in Deutschland)
 Central Council of Oriental Christians in Germany (Zentralrat Orientalischer Christen in Deutschland)
 Central Council of Ex-Muslims (Zentralrat der Ex-Muslime) 
 Central Council of German Sinti and Roma (Zentralrat Deutscher Sinti und Roma)

Trade Unions
 Central Council of Afghan Trade Unions
 Central Council of Trade Unions

Medical organisations
 Central Council of Indian Medicine 
 Central Council of Physical Recreation
 Central Council of Homoeopathy

other
 Central Council of Probation and After-Care Committees 
 Central Council for Education and Training in Social Work

Political organisations
 Latvian Central Council 
 Palestinian Central Council
 Central Council of Ukraine
 The Central Council of Dada for the World Revolution